Phalangacris is a genus of crickets (Orthoptera: Ensifera) in the family Phalangopsidae,  tribe Phalangopsini, subtribe Heterogryllina.  Both species are found in the Indian Ocean islands including the Seychelles.

Species
The Orthoptera Species File lists:
 Phalangacris alluaudi Bolívar, 1895 - type species
 Phalangacris phaloricephala Gorochov, 2006

References

External links
 
 

Ensifera genera
crickets
Orthoptera of Oceania